The Omaha Mustangs were a professional American football team based in Omaha, Nebraska. They began as an independent, semi-pro team in the early 1960s before joining the Professional Football League of America, a newly formed league based on remnants of the United Football League, in 1965. The Mustangs won the PFLA championship in their second season by defeating the Des Moines Warriors in a playoff game in front of 4,530 spectators. The Mustangs were affiliated with the Kansas City Chiefs for the 1967 season (the Chiefs would later be affiliated with the Kansas City Steers).

Omaha moved to the Continental Football League for the 1968 season and finished 7-5 in the Central Division. In September 1968, Glen Hepburn, a two-way player for the Mustangs, died from injuries sustained in a game.

On December 15, 1969 the COFL revoked Omaha's franchise for failure to meet the league's financial obligations. The league itself quietly disbanded after the 1969 season and the Mustangs joined the Trans-American Football League for the 1970 season.

In February 1971 the Mustangs announced they would be joining the Midwest Professional Football League. The Mustangs did not operate for the 1973 season. They were revived as a fully independent team in 1974.

Season-by-season

References

External links
 Mustangs recall memorable ride: Omaha semipro football team found a special time, place by Rich Kaipust, Omaha World-Herald, December 25, 2017

Continental Football League teams
American football teams in Nebraska
Sports in Omaha, Nebraska
American football teams established in 1965
American football teams disestablished in 1970
1965 establishments in Nebraska
1970 disestablishments in Nebraska
Professional Football League of America teams
Defunct sports teams in Nebraska